Aliki Faipule Afega Gaualofa is a Tokelauan politician who served as the 24th and 26th Head of Government of Tokelau from 8 March 2016 to 6 March 2017 and again from 5 March 2018 to 12 March 2019. He had also served as the Faipule (leader) of Fakaofo atoll.

References 

20th-century births
Heads of Government of Tokelau
Living people
People from Fakaofo
Year of birth missing (living people)